This is a list of presidents and mayors of Hornsby Shire, a local government area in the Northern Suburbs of Sydney, New South Wales, Australia. The Shire stretches from the suburbs of Beecroft and North Epping in the south to the Hawkesbury River town of Wisemans Ferry in the north. The first council was elected on 24 November 1906 after the incorporation of the shire.

Presidents and mayors

^  Term extended prior to direct election
^^ First directly elected mayor

References

 
Hornsby
Mayors of Hornsby
Mayors Hornsby